Michael Carty (16 December 1916 – 23 April 1975) was an Irish Fianna Fáil politician. Born in Loughrea, County Galway to Lawrence and Josephine Carty, he was the eldest of seven children. A schoolteacher by profession, he was elected to Dáil Éireann as a Fianna Fáil TD for the Galway South constituency at the 1957 general election. From 1961 to 1969, he represented the Galway East constituency, and from 1969 to 1973 the Clare–South Galway constituency. He retired from politics in 1973.

He served in the government of Seán Lemass on one occasion from 1965 to 1969 as Government Chief Whip, occupying the positions of Parliamentary Secretary to the Taoiseach and Parliamentary Secretary to the Minister for Defence.

References

 

1916 births
1975 deaths
Fianna Fáil TDs
Members of the 16th Dáil
Members of the 17th Dáil
Members of the 18th Dáil
Members of the 19th Dáil
People from Loughrea
Irish schoolteachers
Politicians from County Galway
Parliamentary Secretaries of the 18th Dáil
Government Chief Whip (Ireland)